Bolaven may refer to:

Bolaven Plateau, elevated region in southern Laos
Typhoon Bolaven (disambiguation)